Diazaborine is a chemical compound with properties intermediate between benzene and borazine.  Its chemical formula is CBNH.  It resembles a benzene ring, except that three carbons are replaced by two nitrogen and boron, respectively. Notable molecules contain this moiety include diazaborine B.

References 
Organoboron compounds